John Ros may refer to:
 John Ros, 7th Baron Ros (c. 1397–1421)
 John Ros, 5th Baron Ros (died 1393)